Cyphon is a genus of beetles belonging to the family Scirtidae.

Species:
 Cyphon albanicus
 Cyphon coarctatus
 Cyphon corsicus

References

Scirtidae
Beetle genera